Maku, Chaldoran, Poldasht and Showt (electoral district) is the 5th electoral district in the West Azerbaijan Province of Iran. It has a population of 229,851 and elects 1 member of parliament.

1980
MP in 1980 from the electorate of Maku. (1st)
 Hashem Hejazifar

1984
MP in 1984 from the electorate of Maku. (2nd)
 Aziz Hojjati

1988
MP in 1988 from the electorate of Maku. (3rd)
 Bakhshali Rahimnejad

1992
MP in 1992 from the electorate of Maku. (4th)
 Mohammad Abbaspour

1996
MP in 1996 from the electorate of Maku. (5th)
 Ali Ahmadi

2000
MP in 2000 from the electorate of Maku, Chaldoran, Poldasht and Showt. (6th)
 Mohammad Abbaspour

2004
MP in 2004 from the electorate of Maku, Chaldoran, Poldasht and Showt. (7th)
 Soleiman Jafarzadeh

2008
MP in 2008 from the electorate of Maku, Chaldoran, Poldasht and Showt. (8th)
 Soleiman Jafarzadeh

2012
MP in 2012 from the electorate of Maku, Chaldoran, Poldasht and Showt. (9th)
 Mohammad Alipour Rahmati

2016
MP in 2016 from the electorate of Maku, Chaldoran, Poldasht and Showt. (10th)
 Eynollah Sharifpour

2020
MP in 2020 from the electorate of Maku, Chaldoran, Poldasht and Showt. (11th)
  Mohammad Alipour Rahmati

Notes

References

Electoral districts of West Azerbaijan
Poldasht County
Maku County
Chaldoran County
Showt County
Deputies of Maku, Chaldoran, Poldasht and Showt